There are more than 1,500 properties and historic districts in Colorado listed on the National Register of Historic Places. They are distributed over 63 of Colorado's 64 counties; only the City and County of Broomfield has none.



Current listings by county

The following are approximate tallies of current listings by county. These counts are based on entries in the National Register Information Database as of April 24, 2008 and new weekly listings posted since then on the National Register of Historic Places web site. There are frequent additions to the listings and occasional delistings and the counts here are approximate and not official.  New entries are added to the official Register on a weekly basis.  Also, the counts in this table exclude boundary increase and decrease listings which modify the area covered by an existing property or district and which carry a separate National Register reference number.  The numbers of NRHP listings in each county are documented by tables in each of the individual county list-articles.

Adams County

Alamosa County

Arapahoe County

Archuleta County

|}

Baca County

|}

Bent County

|}

Former listing

|}

Boulder County

City and County of Broomfield
There are no places in the City and County of Broomfield currently listed on the National Register of Historic Places.

Chaffee County

Cheyenne County

|}

Clear Creek County

Conejos County

Costilla County

Crowley County

|}

Former listing

|}

Custer County

|}

Delta County

City and County of Denver

Dolores County

|}

Douglas County

Eagle County

El Paso County

Elbert County

|}

Fremont County

Garfield County

Gilpin County

|}

Grand County

Gunnison County

Hinsdale County

Huerfano County

|}

Jackson County

|}

Jefferson County

Kiowa County

|}

Kit Carson County

|}

Former listing

|}

La Plata County

Lake County

Larimer County

Las Animas County

Lincoln County

|}

Logan County

Mesa County

Mineral County

|}

Moffat County

Montezuma County

Montrose County

Morgan County

Otero County

Ouray County

|}

Park County

Phillips County

|}

Pitkin County

Prowers County

Pueblo County

Rio Blanco County

Rio Grande County

Routt County

Saguache County

San Juan County

San Miguel County

|}

Sedgwick County

|}

Summit County

Teller County

Washington County

|}

Weld County

Yuma County

|}

See also

Bibliography of Colorado
Index of Colorado-related articles
Outline of Colorado
History of Colorado
List of protected areas of Colorado

References

External links

History Colorado website
United States federal government website
United States Department of the Interior website
National Park Service website
National Register of Historic Places

 
Colorado, National Register of Historic Places listings in